Y'All Get Scared Now, Ya Hear! is the debut album by the Scottish indie rock supergroup The Reindeer Section, released on 30 October 2001. The album was recorded over a ten-day period between January and February 2001.

The core band throughout the album consists of vocalist/guitarist Gary Lightbody, drummer Jonny Quinn, guitarist/harmony vocalist William Campbell, acoustic guitarist/harmony vocalist Charles Clark, bassist Gareth Russell, and violinist/vocalist Jenny Reeve with various musicians joining in on a number of tracks - with everyone considered a member in keeping with the collective spirit.

Members of Snow Patrol, Mogwai, Astrid, Belle and Sebastian, Arab Strap and Eva appear on this album.

Track listing
 "Will You Please Be There for Me" – 1:49
 "The Opening Taste" – 2:29
 "12 Hours It Takes Sometimes" – 3:47
 "Deviance" – 1:53
 "If There Is I Haven't Found It Yet" – 4:00
 "Fire Bell" – 1:41
 "If Everything Fell Quiet" – 2:18
 "I've Never Understood" – 2:53
 "Raindrop" – 2:49
 "Sting" – 4:36
 "Billed as Single" – 2:30
 "Tout le Monde" – 4:53
 "Nightfall" – 2:41
 "The Day We All Died" – 2:00

Personnel
 Gary Lightbody - lead and harmony vocals, guitars, keyboards (tracks 6, 9, 11, 13) and harmonica (10, 13)
 Jonny Quinn - drums
 Gareth Russell - bass
 Michael Bannister - piano (tracks 3, 7), Hammond organ (12), Wurlitzer (5)
 William Campbell - guitar, harmony vocals (tracks 4, 6, 7, 9, 10, 11, 12, 13), guitar (12)
 Charles Clark - acoustic guitar, harmony vocals (tracks 2, 4, 6, 7, 10, 12, 13)
 Richard Colburn - congas (track 13), timbaleze (12), pigeon noises (14)
 Mick Cooke - trumpet (track 10), flugelhorn (10)
 John Cummings - guitar (tracks 2, 4, 5, 7, 9, 10, 12, 13)
 Roy Kerr - drums (tracks 9, 11, 13)
 Bob Kildea - guitar (tracks 5, 12)
 Colin MacIntyre - harmony vocals (track 9)
 Gill Mills - backing vocals (track 3)
 Aidan Moffat - lead vocals (track 13)
 Jenny Reeve - lead vocals (track 6), backing vocals (5, 8), violin (5)
 Tony Doogan - recording, mixing
 Katie Arup - design, artwork

References

2001 albums
The Reindeer Section albums